Tanea Richardson is an American artist known for her assemblages and sculptures. Richardson has exhibited her work at the Studio Museum in Harlem, EFA Project Space of the Elizabeth Foundation for the Arts, and at the Museum of Contemporary African Diasporan Arts (MoCADA), in Brooklyn, New York.

Richardson employs everyday materials like telecommunication wires and cables to bind fabric, the work a comment on traditional women’s labor and society's understanding of certain bodies through textiles and language. Roberta Smith of the New York Times described her wall pieces at the Studio Museum in Harlem in 2008, "Initially they seem overly familiar, but they gradually become extremely particular and rather sinister."

A graduate of the Ryman Arts program in Los Angeles and Stanford University, she attended Yale University’s School of Art from 2005.

References

External links
Richardson's Facebook page

Living people
African-American women artists
African-American sculptors
American women sculptors
Feminist artists
Artists from Los Angeles
American contemporary artists
21st-century American women artists
Stanford University alumni
Yale School of Art alumni
Year of birth missing (living people)
21st-century African-American women
21st-century African-American artists